Pessocosma is a genus of moths of the family Crambidae.

Species
Pessocosma bistigmalis (Pryer, 1877)
Pessocosma iolealis (Walker, 1859)
Pessocosma peritalis Hampson, 1899
Pessocosma prolalis (Viette & Legrand in Viette, 1958)

References

Spilomelinae
Crambidae genera
Taxa named by Edward Meyrick